Exorista   is a genus of flies in the family Tachinidae.

Subgenera & species
Subgenus Adenia Robineau-Desvoidy, 1863
E. cuneata Herting, 1971
E. mimula (Meigen, 1824)
E. pseudorustica Chao, 1964
E. rustica (Fallén, 1810)
E. tubulosa Herting, 1967
E. dydas (Walker, 1849)
E. trudis (Reinhard, 1951)
Subgenus Exorista Meigen, 1803
E. amoena Mesnil, 1960
E. brevihirta Liang & Chao, 1992
E. castanea (Wulp, 1894)
E. fasciata (Fallén, 1820)
E. frons Chao, 1964
E. frontata Herting, 1973
E. intermedia Chao & Liang, 1992
E. japonica (Townsend, 1909)
E. larvarum (Linnaeus, 1758)
E. laterosetosa Chao, 1964
E. mella (Walker, 1849)
E. psamathe (Walker, 1849)
E. rossica Mesnil, 1960
E. subnigra (Wulp, 1894)
E. thula Wood, 2002
E. velutina Mesnil, 1953
Subgenus Podotachina Brauer & von Bergenstamm, 1891
E. cantans Mesnil, 1960
E. fuscihirta Chao & Liang, 1992
E. glossatorum (Rondani, 1859)
E. hainanensis Chao & Liang, 1992
E. ladelli (Baranov, 1936)
E. sorbillans (Wiedemann, 1830)
E. tenuicerca Liang & Chao, 1992
E. yunnanica Chao, 1964
Subgenus Ptilotachina Brauer & von Bergenstamm, 1891
E. belanovskii Richter, 1970
E. civilis (Rondani, 1859)
E. grandis (Zetterstedt, 1844)
E. longisquama Liang & Chao, 1992
E. wangi Chao & Liang, 1992
E. xanthaspis (Wiedemann, 1830)
Subgenus Spixomyia Crosskey, 1967
E. antennalis Chao, 1964
E. aureifrons (Baranov, 1936)
E. bisetosa Mesnil, 1940
E. fortis Chao, 1964
E. fuscipennis (Baranov, 1932)
E. grandiforceps Chao, 1964
E. hyalipennis (Baranov, 1932)
E. lepis Chao, 1964
E. penicilla Chao & Liang, 1992
E. quadriseta (Baranov, 1932)
E. spina Chao & Liang, 1992
Unplaced to subgenus
E. rusticella (Baranov, 1936)

References

Diptera of Europe
Diptera of Asia
Diptera of North America
Exoristinae
Tachinidae genera
Taxa named by Johann Wilhelm Meigen